Underground Kingz is the fifth studio album by American hip hop duo UGK. The album was released on August 7, 2007, by Jive Records. The album includes collaborations with Z-RO, T.I., Talib Kweli, Rick Ross, Jazze Pha, Kool G Rap, Big Daddy Kane, Slim Thug, Dizzee Rascal, Too Short, Charlie Wilson, Middle Fingaz, Outkast, Three 6 Mafia, and many more. Production mainly came from Pimp C, N.O. Joe, Lil Jon, Jazze Pha, Swizz Beatz, DJ Paul & Juicy J, Scarface and Marley Marl.

The first single was believed to be "Stop-N-Go", but it was confirmed that the first single was "The Game Belongs To Me", produced by N.O. Joe.

The second single was "Int'l Players Anthem (I Choose You)" featuring OutKast, and the video was released on 106 and Park, June 16, 2007. The track is a remix of "Players Anthem" featuring Three 6 Mafia (both versions were produced by DJ Paul and Juicy J). The video was awarded Video of the Year at the 2008 annual BET Hip-Hop awards. The song was nominated for the Grammy Award for Best Rap Performance by a Duo or Group. This song was number 10 on Rolling Stone's list of the 100 Best Songs of 2007, and reached number 70 on the Billboard Hot 100, making it their only song to chart there.

Pitchfork Media's "Top 500 songs of the 2000s" listed the song at number 43. The album debuted number 1 on the Billboard 200 with 160,000 copies sold in its first week. It was their first album since Pimp C had finished serving a lengthy prison term. The album was also Pimp C's final performance before his death on December 4, 2007, in Los Angeles, California, four months after the album's release. As of 2011, it has sold 500,000 copies.

Track listing
Credits adapted from liner notes.

Samples
"Swishas and Dosha" contains a sample of "From Step to You" by Stephen J. Rideau.
"Int'l Players Anthem (I Choose You)" contains samples of "I Choose You" by Willie Hutch and "I Choose You" by Project Pat.
"Chrome Plated Woman" contains a sample of "Hercules" by Allen Toussaint.
"Life Is 2009" contains a sample of "Life is... Too Short" by Too Short.
"Grind Hard" contains a sample of "Cocaine In The Back of the Ride" by UGK.
"Quit Hatin' the South" contains a sample of "Let's Straighten It Out" by Benny Latimore.
"Trill Niggas Don't Die" contains a sample of "I Just Want to Celebrate" by Nick Zesses & Dino Fekaris.
"How Long Can It Last" contains a sample of "Something in the Past" by One Way.
"Still Ridin' Dirty" contains a sample of "The Fix" by Scarface.
"Two Type of Bitches" contains a sample of "Daddy Could Swear, I Declare" by Gladys Knight & The Pips.
"Real Women" contains a sample of "Can't Hide Love" by Earth, Wind, & Fire.
"Candy" contains a sample of "Bridge Thru Time" by Lonnie Liston Smith.
"Shattered Dreams" contains a sample of "Goin' Thru School and Love" by Raydio.
"Next Up" contains a sample of "The Symphony" by Juice Crew.
"Living This Life" contains samples of "Free" by Goodie Mob and "Free at Last" by Al Green.
"Hit the Block" contains a sample of "Spit Your Game (Remix)" by The Notorious B.I.G.

Chart positions

Weekly charts

Year-end charts

References

2007 albums
UGK albums
Jive Records albums
Albums produced by Swizz Beatz
Albums produced by Jazze Pha
Albums produced by the Runners
Albums produced by Marley Marl
Albums produced by Lil Jon
Albums produced by K-Def
Albums produced by N.O. Joe
Albums produced by DJ Paul
Albums produced by Juicy J